Hala Gryfia is an arena in Słupsk, Poland.  It is primarily used for basketball. Hala Gryfia holds 2,500 people and hosts the home games of Czarni Słupsk. It was built in 1982.

References

Indoor arenas in Poland
Buildings and structures in Słupsk
Sport in Pomeranian Voivodeship
Sports venues in Pomeranian Voivodeship
Basketball venues in Poland